Cercle Sportif Hobscheid was a football club from Hobscheid, Luxembourg. The club merged with FC Olympique Eischen in 2007 to form FC Alliance Äischdall.

Hobscheid in Europe
 R1 = first round

References
Club history  at weltfussballarchiv.com

Defunct football clubs in Luxembourg
Association football clubs established in 1932
Association football clubs disestablished in 2007
1932 establishments in Luxembourg
2007 disestablishments in Luxembourg